The National Waterways Act, 2016 is an Act of Parliament of India. It was tabled in Lok Sabha by Minister of Shipping, Road Transport and Highways Nitin Gadkari on 5 May 2015. The Act merges 5 existing Acts which have declared the 5 National Waterways and proposes 101 additional National Waterways. The Act came into force from 12 April 2016.

History
The National Waterways Bill, 2015 was tabled in Lok Sabha by Minister of Shipping, Road Transport and Highways Nitin Gadkari on 5 May 2015. It was passed in Lok Sabha on 21 December 2015 and then in Rajya Sabha on 9 March 2016. Then, it was finally passed in Lok Sabha again on 15 March 2016 due to the amendments made in Rajya Sabha moved by Minister of State for Shipping Pon Radhakrishnan.

Provisions

- Under Entry 24 of the Union List of the Seventh Schedule of the Constitution, the central government can make laws on shipping and navigation on inland waterways which are classified as national waterways by Parliament by law.

 
- The Bill identifies additional 106 waterways as national waterways.  The Schedule of the Bill also specifies the extent of development to be undertaken on each waterway.

- The Bill repeals the five Acts that declare the existing national waterways.  These five national waterways are now covered under the Bill.

- The Statement of Objects and Reasons of the Bill states that while inland waterways are recognised as a fuel efficient, cost effective and environment-friendly mode of transport, it has received lesser investment as compared to roads and railways.  Since inland waterways are lagging behind other modes of transport, the central government has evolved a policy for integrated development of inland waterways.

See also
 Inland Waterways Authority of India
 The Inland Vessels (Amendment) Act, 2007

References

External
 The National Waterways Bill, 2015 on PRS

Acts of the Parliament of India 2016
Waterways in India
Ministry of Ports, Shipping and Waterways (India)
2016 in Indian economy